Parozodes is a genus of beetles in the family Cerambycidae, containing the following species:

 Parozodes erythrocephalus Aurivillius, 1897
 Parozodes pilosus Fuchs, 1956

References

Rhopalophorini